Kostina is a rural locality in Soldatsky Selsoviet Rural Settlement, Fatezhsky District, Kursk Oblast, Russia. Population:

Geography 
The village is located on the Gryaznaya Rudka River (a right tributary of the Ruda in the basin of the Svapa), 90 km from the Russia–Ukraine border, 42 km north-west of Kursk, 17 km south-west of the district center – the town Fatezh, 12.5 km from the selsoviet center – Soldatskoye.

 Climate
Kostina has a warm-summer humid continental climate (Dfb in the Köppen climate classification).

Transport 
Kostina is located 15 km from the federal route  Crimea Highway as part of the European route E105, 15 km from the road of regional importance  (Fatezh – Dmitriyev), 3 km from the road of intermunicipal significance  (38K-038 – Soldatskoye – Shuklino), 28 km from the nearest railway halt 552 km (railway line Navlya – Lgov-Kiyevsky).

The rural locality is situated 46 km from Kursk Vostochny Airport, 158 km from Belgorod International Airport and 243 km from Voronezh Peter the Great Airport.

References

Notes

Sources

Rural localities in Fatezhsky District